Donald Boudria,  (born August 30, 1949) is a former Canadian politician. He served in the House of Commons of Canada from 1984 to 2005 as a member of the Liberal Party of Canada, and was a cabinet minister in the government of Jean Chrétien.

Municipal and provincial politics
Boudria was born in Hull, Quebec, raised in Sarsfield, Ontario, and educated in the area, and was a public servant before entering political life. A Franco-Ontarian, he was elected as a councillor in Cumberland Township in 1976, and remained a council member until his election to the Legislative Assembly of Ontario in the 1981 provincial election. Boudria defeated Progressive Conservative incumbent Joseph Albert Bélanger by 5,172 votes in Prescott and Russell, and served in the legislature for three years as a member the Ontario Liberal Party, which was then the official opposition to the Progressive Conservative government of William Davis.

Entry into federal politics
He left provincial politics to run for the House of Commons in the 1984 federal election. Boudria won a convincing victory in Ontario's easternmost riding, Glengarry—Prescott—Russell, even as his party suffered a landslide defeat against Brian Mulroney's Progressive Conservatives. Joining the opposition benches of the Commons in 1984, he became a member of the Liberal Rat Pack with Brian Tobin, Sheila Copps and John Nunziata. This group of young Liberals made it their business to harass the Tories at every possible turn.

Re-election and cabinet positions
Boudria was re-elected without difficulty in 1988, 1993, 1997 and 2000. Like the other Rat Pack members, he rose rapidly in the Liberal ranks. From 1991 to 1993, he served as Deputy Liberal House Leader. After the Liberals won a huge majority in 1993, Boudria became a backbencher once again for a time. He  was appointed Chief Government Whip on September 15, 1994. He held this position until October 4, 1996, when he was named to Cabinet as Minister for International Cooperation and Minister responsible for La Francophonie.

Boudria was named Leader of the Government in the House of Commons after the 1997 election. He retained this position until January 14, 2002, when he was again given a full portfolio as Minister of Public Works and Government Services. In March 2002, he stayed at a weekend resort owned by Groupe Everest, a prominent recipient of departmental funds. The trip was paid for by Boudria's son, and the minister was not directly accused of a conflict of interest. He was nonetheless deemed to have shown poor judgement, and was reassigned as Minister of State and Leader of the Government in the House of Commons on May 26, 2002.

Chrétien loyalist
Boudria was known within the Liberal caucus as a leading Chrétien loyalist. During Question Period, he frequently handed Chrétien notes from a white binder. In 2000, this practice led Reform Party deputy leader Deb Grey to wonder if Chrétien could answer a question "without any help from Binder Boy." The nickname stuck.

He lost his cabinet position in December 2003 when Paul Martin replaced Chrétien as Liberal leader and prime minister. Subsequently, he was elected chair of the Standing Committee on Official Languages (3rd session of the 37th parliament) and the Standing Committee on Procedure and House Affairs (1st session of the 38th parliament).

On May 6, 2005, Boudria announced he would not run in the next election.

Life after government
Boudria's memoir, Busboy: From Kitchen to Cabinet, was published in late 2005. In 2006, he assisted Stéphane Dion's campaign for the leadership of the Liberal Party. Boudria joined Ottawa-based public relations agency Hill & Knowlton Canada as a senior associate in May 2006, and was promoted to senior counsellor in March 2007.

His son Dan Boudria was elected to the Conseil des écoles catholiques de langue française du Centre-Est in the 2006 municipal elections. In early 2007, the Liberal Party of Canada Association of Glengarry—Prescott—Russell selected his son as candidate in the 2008 federal election. He lost to incumbent Conservative candidate Pierre Lemieux.

Electoral record

Note: Conservative vote is compared to the total of the Canadian Alliance vote and Progressive Conservative vote in 2000 election.

		
Note: Canadian Alliance vote is compared to the Reform vote in 1997 election.

See also
 List of University of Waterloo people

References

External links
 Don Boudria: Personal Website
 How'd They Vote?: Don Boudria's voting history and quotes
 

1949 births
Living people
People from the United Counties of Prescott and Russell
Members of the 26th Canadian Ministry
Members of the House of Commons of Canada from Ontario
Liberal Party of Canada MPs
Franco-Ontarian people
Members of the King's Privy Council for Canada
Politicians from Gatineau
University of Waterloo alumni
Ontario Liberal Party MPPs